James Johnson Edwards (March 6, 1918January 4, 1970) was an American actor in films and television. His most famous role was as Private Peter Moss in the 1949 film Home of the Brave, in which he portrayed a Black soldier experiencing racial prejudice while serving in the South Pacific during World War II.

Career
Edwards majored in psychology at Knoxville College in Tennessee and continued his education at Northwestern University where he received a master's degree in drama. While enrolled at Northwestern, he participated in student productions and in the Federal Theatre Project.

During World War II, he was commissioned as a first lieutenant in the U.S. Army.

After the war he appeared on the New York stage when he assumed the role of the war hero in the touring play Deep Are the Roots.

Throughout his early and mid acting career, Edwards portrayed African American soldiers, playing such characters in Home of the Brave (1949), The Steel Helmet (1951), Bright Victory (1951), Battle Hymn (1957), Men in War (1957), Blood and Steel (1959), and Pork Chop Hill (1959) as well as an uncredited Messman in The Caine Mutiny. (1954).

It was believed he was originally cast in Universal's Red Ball Express but was replaced by  Sidney Poitier when he refused to testify before the House Un-American Activities Committee.

Other notable roles were in Stanley Kubrick's The Killing (1956) and John Frankenheimer's The Manchurian Candidate (1962).

Edwards was prolific on TV in the 1960s, playing character roles in various series such as Peter Gunn, The Fugitive, Burke's Law, Dr. Kildare and Mannix, before his death of a heart attack at the age of 51 in 1970.

One of his final roles was as General George S. Patton's longtime personal valet, Sergeant Major William George Meeks, in the film Patton.

Death
James Edwards died on Sunday, January 4, 1970, in San Diego, CA. He was working on a film script in a rented house in San Diego when he complained of chest pains. He was taken to Sharp Memorial Hospital, where he died. The New York Times reported that his age was given as 42.

Filmography

 The Set-Up (1949) as Luther Hawkins
 Home of the Brave (1949) as Private Peter Moss
 Manhandled (1949) as Henry, Bennet's Butler (uncredited)
 The Steel Helmet  (1951) as Cpl. Thompson
 Bright Victory (1951) as Joe Morgan
 The Member Of The Wedding (1952) as Honey Camden Brown
 The Joe Louis Story (1953) as Jack 'Chappie' Blackburn
 The Caine Mutiny (1954) as Whittaker (uncredited)
 African Manhunt (1955) as Native Guide
 Seven Angry Men (1955) as Ned Green
 The Phenix City Story (1955) as Zeke Ward
 The Killing (1956) as Track Parking Attendant
 Battle Hymn (1957) as Lt. Maples
 Men in War (1957) as Sgt. Killian
 Fräulein (1958) as Cpl. S. Hanks
 Tarzan's Fight for Life (1958) as Futa
 Anna Lucasta (1958) as Eddie
 Night of the Quarter Moon (1959) as Asa Tully
 Pork Chop Hill (1959) as Cpl. Jurgens
 Blood and Steel (1959) as George
 The Manchurian Candidate (1962) as Corporal Allen Melvin
 Legend of Bearheart (1964) released as Legend of the Northwest in 1978 
 The Sandpiper (1965) as Larry Brant
 The Virginian (1968, TV Series) as The Mustangers
 The Young Runaways (1968) as Sergeant Joe Collyer
 Coogan's Bluff (1968) as Sgt. Jackson
 Patton (1970) as Sergeant Major William George Meeks
 Doomsday Voyage (1972) as Coast Guard Officer
 Legend of the Northwest (1978) (final film role)

Notes

References
 Deane, Pamala S. (8 December 2009) James Edwards: African American Hollywood Icon, McFarland

External links

1918 births
1970 deaths
American male film actors
American male television actors
Male actors from Indiana
People from Muncie, Indiana
African-American male actors
20th-century American male actors
United States Army personnel of World War II
United States Army officers
20th-century African-American people
Knoxville College alumni
Northwestern University alumni
Federal Theatre Project people